Mitchell or Mitch Anderson may refer to:

 Mitch Anderson (24 character), fictional character from TV series 24
 Mitch Anderson (director) (born 1967), film director
 Mitchell Anderson (born 1961), American character actor
 J. J. Anderson (Mitchell Anderson, born 1960), American basketball player
 Mitch Anderson/Outburst, leader of the Supermen of America